Femmes d'aujourd'hui is the second studio album by Jeanne Mas, released in April 1986 by Pathé Marconi. Music for 8 of the 10 tracks was written by Romano Musumarra. The French singer Daniel Balavoine also participated in the production of the album (including "Cœur en stéréo"). Charting from 3 May 1986, it peaked at #1 for two months on the French Albums Chart and spent 63 weeks in the top 30, most of them in the top ten. It was certified Platinum and remains Mas' most successful album to date in terms of sales and chart performance.

Track listing
"La Geisha" (Jeanne Mas, Romano Musumarra) – 5:06
"En Rouge et Noir" (J. Mas, Massimo Calabrese, Piero Calabrese, Lorenzo Meinardi, R. Musumarra) – 4:32
"Idéali" (J. Mas) – 4:35
"Lola" (J. Mas, R. Musumarra) – 3:44
"Femme d'aujourd'hui" (J. Mas, R. Musumarra, Roberto Zaneli) – 3:34
"Mourir d'ennui" (J. Mas, Joe Hammer) – 4:08
"Plus forte que l'océan" (J. Mas, R. Musumarra) – 4:09
"Sauvez-moi" (J. Mas, R. Musumarra, R. Zaneli) – 3:55
"S'envoler jusqu'au bout" (J. Mas, R. Musumarra) – 4:43
"L'Enfant" (J. Mas, R. Musumarra, R. Zaneli) – 5:22

Album credits

Personnel
Jeanne Mas – lead vocals, backing vocals
Carol Welsman – backing vocals
John Wooloff – guitar ("La geisha", "En rouge et noir", "Lola", "Femme d'aujourd'hui", "Mourir d'ennui" & "Plus forte que l'océan")
Benjamin Raffaëlli – guitar ("Sauvez-moi")
Romano Musumarra – guitar ("S'envoler jusqu'au bout" & "L'enfant"), piano & programming ("Femme d'aujourd'hui")
Dominique Grimaldi – bass ("Sauvez-moi")
Thierry Durbet – synthesizer, drum programming ("Sauvez-moi")
Walter Martino – drums ("En rouge et noir", "Ideali" & "S'envoler jusqu'au bout")
Joe Hammer – drums ("Plus forte que l'océan")

Production
Arrangements & producer - Romano Musumarra
Arrangements - Thierry Durbet ("Sauvez-moi")
Producer - Joe Hammer ("Mourir d'ennui")
Producers - Dominique Blanc-Francard, Thierry Durbet, Jeanne Mas ("Sauvez-moi")
Engineer - John "Puk" Quist at PUK Studios
Engineer - Dominique Blanc-Francard at Studio du Palais des Congrès
Engineer - Gianpaolo Bresciani at Titania Studios ("Ideali" & "S'envoler jusqu'au bout")
Mixing - Dominique Blanc-Francard
Mixing - John "Puk" Quist ("Mourir d'ennui" & "L'enfant")

Design
Photography - Ennio Antonangeli, Tato
Assistant - Silvana Fantino
Cover design - Jeanne Mas

Charts, certifications and sales

Covers
In 1987, Japanese singer Akina Nakamori covered Femmes d'aujourd'hui  in her studio album Cross My Palm under title Modern Woman performed in the english, instead of french. Nakamori version was used as a television commercial for Pioneer Corporation's mini component stereo system Private CD770D.

References

External links
 Official site

1986 albums
Jeanne Mas albums